In American political discourse, the "loss of China" is the unexpected Chinese Communist Party takeover of mainland China from the U.S.-backed Chinese Kuomintang government in 1949 and therefore the "loss of China to communism."

Background 
During World War II, Franklin D. Roosevelt had assumed that China, under Chiang Kai-shek's leadership, would become a great power after the war, along with the U.S., the United Kingdom, and the Soviet Union. John Paton Davies Jr. was among the "China Hands" who were blamed for the loss of China. While they predicted a Communist victory, they did not advocate one. Davies later wrote that he and the Foreign Service officers in China reported to Washington that material support to Chiang Kai-shek during the war against Japan would not transform the Nationalist government, adding that Roosevelt's poor choice of personal emissaries to China contributed to the failure of his policy. Historian Arthur Waldron argues that the president mistakenly thought of China as a great power securely held by Chiang Kai-shek, whose hold on power was actually tenuous. Davies predicted that after the war China would become a power vacuum, tempting to Moscow, which the Nationalists could not deal with. In that sense, says Waldron, "the collapse of China into communism was aided by the incompetence of Roosevelt's policy."

In August 1949, Secretary of State Dean Acheson issued the China White Paper, a compilation of official documents to defend the administration's record and argue that there was little that the United States could have done to prevent Communist victory.

Loss 
In 1949, the fall of the Kuomintang government was widely viewed within the United States as a catastrophe. The author William Manchester remembered the public reaction in 1949 in his 1973 book The Glory and the Dream: The China it knew—Pearl Buck's peasants, rejoicing in the good earth—had been dependable, democratic, warm and above all pro-American. Throughout the great war the United Nations Big Four had been Churchill, Roosevelt, Stalin and Chiang. Stalin's later treachery had been deplorable but unsurprising. But Chiang Kai-shek! Acheson's strategy to contain Red aggression seemed to burst wide open. [...] Everything American diplomats had achieved in Europe—the Truman Doctrine, the Marshall Plan, NATO—momentarily seemed annulled by this disaster in Asia. At the time, Acheson's China White Paper with its catalog of $2 billion worth of American aid provided to China since 1946 was widely mocked as an excuse for allowing what was widely seen as a geopolitical disaster which allowed the formation of a Sino-Soviet bloc with the potential to dominate Eurasia.

Aftermath 
The "loss of China" was portrayed by critics of the Truman Administration as an "avoidable catastrophe". It led to a "rancorous and divisive debate" and the issue was exploited by the Republicans at the polls in 1952. It also played a large role in the rise of Joseph McCarthy, who, with his allies, sought scapegoats for that "loss", targeting notably Owen Lattimore, an influential scholar of Central Asia.

In his speech on 7 February 1950 in Wheeling, West Virginia before the Ohio County Women's Republican Club, McCarthy blamed Acheson, whom he called "this pompous diplomat in striped pants", for the "loss of China", making the sensationalist claim: "While I cannot take the time to name all of the men in the State Department who have been named as members of the Communist Party and members of a spy ring, I have here in my hand a list of 205...a list of names that were known to the Secretary of State and who nevertheless are still working and shaping the policy of the State Department". The speech, which McCarthy repeated shortly afterwards in Salt Lake City, made him into a national figure.  In the early 1950s, the Truman administration was attacked for the "loss" of China with Senator McCarthy charging in a 1950 speech that "Communists and queers" in the State Department, whom President Harry S. Truman had allegedly tolerated, were responsible for the "loss" of China. In a speech that said much about fears of American masculinity going "soft" that were common in the 1950s, McCarthy charged that "prancing minions of the Moscow party line" had been in charge of policy towards China in the State Department while the Secretary of State Dean Acheson was a "dilettante diplomat who cringed before the Soviet colossus".

The report of the Senate Internal Security Subcommittee in 1951 written by Senator Pat McCarran concluded that China was indeed "lost" because of the policy followed by the State Department, declaring: "Owen Lattimore and John Carter Vincent were influential in bringing about a change in United States policy [...] favorable to the Chinese Communists." Although McCarran was careful not to call Lattimore a Soviet spy in his report, which would have allowed him to sue for libel, he came very close with the statement: "Owen Lattimore was, from some time beginning in the 1930s, a conscious, articulate instrument of the Soviet conspiracy."

In response to the McCarran report, an editorial in the Washington Post attacked the thesis, stating "that China was a sort of political dependency of the United States to be retained or given away to Moscow by a single administrative decision taken in Washington. It was not. China was-and still is-a vast continental land, diverse and disunited, peopled by some half a billion human beings-most of them living at a level of bare subsistence, immemorially exploited by landlords and harassed by warlords, in the throes of revolutionary pressures and counter-pressures that have been felt the world over. The United States has never at any time been in a position to exercise more than a minor influence on China's destiny. China was lost by the Chinese."

Reception and analysis 
Noam Chomsky, a leading critic of U.S. foreign policy, has commented that the terminology "loss of China" is revealing of U.S. foreign policy attitudes:

In a 2010 book review, American historian Miles Maochun Yu criticized the "endless fight over who got it right on China, whatever the Chinese reality. That is to say, in the peculiar debate on Communist China, the questions asked and the issues debated often reflected American partisan politics and policy spins rather than Chinese reality."

One of the more imaginative and popular books about the "loss of China" was the 1952 book The Shanghai Conspiracy by General Charles A. Willoughby which claimed the Soviet spy ring headed by Richard Sorge (arrested in 1941 and executed in 1944) was still in existence. Willoughby further claimed the Sorge spy ring had caused the "loss of China" in 1949 and was in the process of steadily taking over the U.S. government. The American Japanologist Michael Schaller wrote that Willoughby was indeed correct on some points as that Sorge was a spy for the Soviet Union and the same was probably true of certain left-wing American journalists who worked with Sorge in Shanghai in the early 1930s, but much of Willoughby's book reflected the paranoid mind of one of the most incompetent military intelligence officers ever in American history.

See also 

 George Atcheson, Jr.
 Brooks Atkinson
 China lobby
 Chinese Civil War
 Cold War
 Dixie Mission
 History of China
 Henry Luce
 Marshall Mission
 McCarthyism
 The Men Who Lost China, a 2013 documentary film by Mitch Anderson
 John S. Service
 Venona
 Albert C. Wedemeyer

References

Further reading 

 Newman, Robert P. (1992). Owen Lattimore and the "Loss" of China. Berkeley and Los Angeles: University of California Press. .
 
 . Classroom materials on the question, including a timeline, document sets, handouts, and Historical Thinking Chart.

China–United States relations
1949 in the United States
1949 in China